Adolphus "Dolly" Jones (born 24 July 1984) is a Kittitian and Nevisian track and field athlete and soccer player.

In the decathlon he competed for his native country at the 2007 Pan American Games, the 2010 Commonwealth Games, and the Central American and Caribbean Championships in Athletics in 2008 and 2009. He holds several Saint Kitts and Nevis records in athletics, including 7258 points in the decathlon and 5475 points for the indoor heptathlon.

He played as goalkeeper for the Saint Kitts and Nevis national football team in two matches for the 2006 FIFA World Cup qualifiers.

Career

Early life
Born in Basseterre, he began taking part in both athletics and soccer as a teenager. At the 2003 Leeward Islands Junior Championships in Athletics he competed in a variety of events, winning medals in the 800 metres, high jump, long jump, triple jump and javelin throw. He entered the 800 m and 1500 metres at the 2003 CARIFTA Games, placing sixth and seventeenth, respectively.

He was selected for the Saint Kitts and Nevis national football team in 2004 and was the goalkeeper for two of their games in the 2006 FIFA World Cup qualifiers. In November that year, he conceded thirteen goals over two matches against Mexico. He had better outings in the 2005 Caribbean Cup qualifiers, keeping a clean sheet in a 2–0 win against Antigua and Barbuda and winning 6–1 against Montserrat, although the team lost to Haiti by a goal to nil.

Senior competition
In 2006, he began studying at Paul Quinn College in Texas, United States. He competed athletically for the school in track events, as well as soccer. Later that month he made his senior debut international performance in track and field, running in the 800 m heats and placing twelfth in the high jump at the 2006 Central American and Caribbean Games. Two further outings came in 2007, both in July. First, he made his decathlon debut at the 2007 NACAC Championships, coming second with 6092 points to Darwin Colón in a two-man contest. The following week both men entered the decathlon at the 2007 Pan American Games, although Jones failed to complete all ten events. He also ran with the 4×400 m relay team in the heat stages.

His high jump mark came in the decathlon competition at the 2008 Central American and Caribbean Championships in Athletics, which he failed to finish. He enrolled at The University of Texas at Arlington, majoring in interdisciplinary studies. Competing on the Texas-Arlington Mavericks team, he scored 5146 points in the indoor heptathlon at the Southland Conference Indoor Championships Outdoors he scored a best of 6980 points at the Texas Relays before setting a national record mark of 7178 points for fourth at the Southland Conference Outdoor Championships. His third and last decathlon outing that year was at the 2009 Central American and Caribbean Championships in Athletics, where he came seventh with 6774 points in total. In the individual events he set seven personal bests outdoors, including national records in the 110 metres hurdles (15.19 seconds) and the pole vault.

2010 Commonwealth Games
Working with track coach Eric Francis, who grew up in Saint Kitts, he opened his 2010 indoor season with a 5532-point heptathlon at the Iowa State Track and Field Classic (on an oversized track not suitable for record purposes). Following this he set a series of national indoor records at the Southland Conference meet: he ran 8.46 seconds for the 60 m hurdles, recorded  in the high jump,  in the pole vault, and a total of 5475 points in the heptathlon. His sole major outdoor performance that year saw him improve his decathlon national record to 7258 points, which was enough for seventh place at the 2010 Commonwealth Games and included a 110 m hurdles national record of 14.89 seconds. He was the highest rankings Caribbean athlete in the event. Despite this result, he ceased competing internationally that year.

He returned to Saint Kitts and became involved with Garden Hotspurs FC, a Basseterre soccer club, and played for the team as well as being appointed as club Vice President in 2013.

Personal bests
Outdoor
100 metres – 11.06 sec (2008)
400 metres – 48.92 sec (2008)
800 metres – 1:56.81 min (2003) 
1500 metres – 4:22.77 min (2008)
110 metres hurdles – 14.89 sec (2010) 
High jump –  (2014) 
Pole vault –  (2009) 
Long jump –  (2010)
Shot put –  (2010)
Discus throw –  (2010)
Javelin throw –  (2009)
Decathlon – 7258 points (2010) 

Indoor
60 metres – 7.19 sec (2010)
400 metres – 49.43 sec (2007)
1000 metres – 2:51.13 min (2010)
60 metres hurdles – 8.46 sec (2010) 
High jump –  (2010) 
Pole vault –  (2010) 
Long jump –  (2010)
Shot put –  (2010) 
Heptathlon – 5475 points (2010) 
Heptathlon over-sized track: 5532 points (2010)

International competition record

Notes
 Some sources list his birthday as 29 January 1984.

References

External links
 
 

1984 births
Living people
People from Basseterre
Saint Kitts and Nevis male decathletes
Saint Kitts and Nevis footballers
Saint Kitts and Nevis international footballers
Association football goalkeepers
University of Texas at Arlington alumni
Athletes (track and field) at the 2007 Pan American Games
Pan American Games competitors for Saint Kitts and Nevis
Athletes (track and field) at the 2010 Commonwealth Games
Commonwealth Games competitors for Saint Kitts and Nevis
Garden Hotspurs FC players